The T7 Holin family (TC# 1.E.6) is a member of the Holin Superfamily II. Members of this family are predominantly found in Caudovirales and Pseudomonadota. They typically have only 1 transmembrane segment (TMS) and vary from 60 to 130 amino acyl residues in length. A representative list of proteins belonging to this family can be found in the Transporter Classification Database.

See also 
 Holin
 Lysin
 Transporter Classification Database

Further reading 
 Hammerling, Michael J; Ellefson, Jared W; Boutz, Daniel R; Marcotte, Edward M; Ellington, Andrew D; Barrick, Jeffrey E. "Bacteriophages use an expanded genetic code on evolutionary paths to higher fitness".Nature Chemical Biology 10 (3): 178–180.doi:10.1038/nchembio.1450. PMC 3932624.PMID 24487692.
 Lee, Jung Seok; Jang, Ho Bin; Kim, Ki Sei; Kim, Tae Hwan; Im, Se Pyeong; Kim, Si Won; Lazarte, Jassy Mary S.; Kim, Jae Sung; Jung, Tae Sung (2015-01-01). "Complete Genomic and Lysis-Cassette Characterization of the Novel Phage, KBNP1315, which Infects Avian Pathogenic Escherichia coli (APEC)". PLoS ONE 10 (11): e0142504.doi:10.1371/journal.pone.0142504. ISSN 1932-6203.PMC 4640515. PMID 26555076.
 Nguyen, Huong Minh; Kang, Changwon (2014-02-01). "Lysis delay and burst shrinkage of coliphage T7 by deletion of terminator Tφ reversed by deletion of early genes". Journal of Virology 88 (4): 2107–2115.doi:10.1128/JVI.03274-13. ISSN 1098-5514.PMC 3911561. PMID 24335287.
 Summer, Elizabeth J.; Enderle, Christopher J.; Ahern, Stephen J.; Gill, Jason J.; Torres, Cruz P.; Appel, David N.; Black, Mark C.; Young, Ry; Gonzalez, Carlos F. (2010-01-01). "Genomic and biological analysis of phage Xfas53 and related prophages of Xylella fastidiosa".Journal of Bacteriology 192 (1): 179–190.doi:10.1128/JB.01174-09. ISSN 1098-5530.PMC 2798268. PMID 19897657.
 Xu, Youqiang; Ma, Yuyue; Yao, Su; Jiang, Zengyan; Pei, Jiangsen; Cheng, Chi (2016-03-01)."Characterization, Genome Sequence, and Analysis of Escherichia Phage CICC 80001, a Bacteriophage Infecting an Efficient L-Aspartic Acid Producing Escherichia coli".Food and Environmental Virology 8 (1): 18–26.doi:10.1007/s12560-015-9218-0. ISSN 1867-0342.PMID 26501200.
 Zhang, Xing; Studier, F. William (2004-07-16)."Multiple Roles of T7 RNA Polymerase and T7 Lysozyme During Bacteriophage T7 Infection". Journal of Molecular Biology 340 (4): 707–730. doi:10.1016/j.jmb.2004.05.006.

References 

Holins
Protein families